Black Byrd is a 1973 album by Donald Byrd and the first of his Blue Note albums to be produced by Larry Mizell, assisted by his brother, former Motown producer Fonce. In the jazz funk idiom, it is among Blue Note Records' best selling album releases.  The title of the album inspired the name of Byrd's apprentice group, The Blackbyrds.

Track listing

Personnel 
 Donald Byrd - trumpet, flugelhorn, electric trumpet, vocals
 Allan Curtis Barnes - flute, oboe, saxophone
 Roger Glenn - saxophone, flute
 Fonce Mizell - trumpet, vocals
 Larry Mizell - vocals
 Kevin Toney - piano
 Freddie Perren - piano, synthesizer, vocals
 Dean Parks, David T. Walker, Barney Perry - guitar
 Joe Sample - piano, electric piano
 Chuck Rainey, Wilton Felder, Joe Hill - bass
 Harvey Mason, Sr, Keith Killgo - drums
 Bobbye Hall Porter, Perk Jacobs, Stephanie Spruill - percussion
 King Errisson - congas and bongos

References

External links 
 [ Allmusic review]

1973 albums
Blue Note Records albums
Donald Byrd albums
Jazz-funk albums
Albums produced by the Mizell Brothers